David A. Hidalgo is an American reconstructive and aesthetic plastic surgeon, author, and visual artist. He holds the academic title of Clinical Professor of Surgery at Weill Cornell Medical College (New York-Presbyterian) in New York City.

During his tenure as the former Chief of the Plastic and Reconstructive Service at Memorial Sloan-Kettering Cancer Center in New York,  Hidalgo performed the first fibula free flap for mandible (jaw) reconstruction. This procedure, performed in cancer patients, utilized microsurgical techniques to preserve viability of the bone transplant. Additional development of the technique, sequentially published in Plastic and Reconstructive Surgery, delineated its unique advantages.

Biography

Early life and education 
Hidalgo was born in Hartford, Connecticut, the youngest of three boys of first-generation immigrant parents. His father, Enrique Hidalgo, an orphan from Guayaquil, Ecuador, graduated from the Massachusetts Institute of Technology and was an aerospace engineer during the Cold War. He married Liselotte Schlumberger, from Heidelberg Germany, after World War II. 

Hidalgo attended Georgetown University in Washington, D.C., where he completed a bachelor of science degree, magna cum laude, in fine arts and biology in 1974. He subsequently earned a medical degree at Georgetown and then completed residencies in general surgery, plastic surgery, and a fellowship in microsurgery, all at New York University Medical Center (now NYU Langone Health) in 1985.

Career 
Hidalgo was certified by the American Board of Surgery (1985), and American Board of Plastic Surgery (1987). 

His initial experience with the fibula free flap for mandible reconstruction was documented in the publication Fibula Free Flap: A New Method of Mandible Reconstruction. This article was ranked sixth of the 25 most cited articles on plastic surgery for the last 50 years. Hidalgo established a fellowship training program in microsurgery during his tenure at Memorial.

Hidalgo has authored over 100 scientific papers on microsurgical techniques for reconstructive surgery, facial aesthetic surgery, and body contouring surgery. These articles have appeared in Plastic and Reconstructive Surgery, Aesthetic Surgery Journal, and the Annals of Plastic Surgery. His microsurgery textbook, Microsurgery in Trauma (Futura Publishing Co., 1987), was written with the late microsurgeon William Shaw.

Hidalgo was the recipient of the James Barrett Brown Award in 1992 for his work on mandible reconstruction. He was the national visiting professor for the Plastic Surgery Educational Foundation in 2002, and was the Cosmetic Section editor for Plastic and Reconstructive Surgery, from 2012 to 2020.  .

Hidalgo was the 2021 V.H. Kazanjian Visiting Professor at Hansjorg Wyss Department of Plastic Surgery, NYU Langone Health, New York University.

He received the 2022 Founders Award from the Lung Cancer Research Foundation for his seminal efforts in the private funding of lung cancer research.

Personal life 
Hidalgo is married to Mary Ann Tighe, a commercial real estate broker  .

References 

1952 births
Living people
American plastic surgeons
People from Hartford, Connecticut
Georgetown College (Georgetown University) alumni
Weill Medical College of Cornell University faculty
Georgetown University School of Medicine alumni